Ifa Isfansyah (born Yogyakarta, 1979) is an Indonesian film director. Initially a maker of short films, his first featured film, Garuda di Dadaku (Garuda on my Chest), was released in 2009. His following film, Sang Penari (The Dancer), won four Citra Awards at the 2011 Indonesian Film Festival.

Biography
Ifa was born in Yogyakarta in 1979. He grew up in a small village and enjoyed soccer in his youth; first playing with a Muhammadiyah-sponsored team, he was a reserve in junior high school. After high school, where he dabbled in basketball and playing the bass, he enrolled at the Indonesian Institute of the Arts.

In 2001, Ifa founded the independent film community Fourcolors Films; the following year, he released his first short film, Air Mata Surga (Heaven's Tears), together with Eddie Cahyono. Mayar, also released in 2002, which was shown in several film festivals,  including International Film Festival Rotterdam.

Four years later, Ifa released Harap Tenang, Ada Ujian! (Please Be Quiet, There are Tests!), a short film about the 2006 FIFA World Cup in comparison with the 2006 Yogyakarta earthquake, which was screened in film festivals in Indonesia, Japan, Kazakhstan. The same year he received a scholarship to study film at Im Kwon Taek Film School in Dongseo University, South Korea. In 2007 he released Setengah Sendok Teh (Half a Teaspoonful).

Ifa made his feature film debut with Garuda di Dadaku (Garuda on my Chest), which was released on 18 June 2009; the film follows a young boy who dreams of playing in the Indonesian football league.

On 10 November 2011, Ifa released his second feature-length film, Sang Penari (The Dancer), which had spent three years in production. Based on the trilogy Ronggeng Dukuh Paruk (Ronggeng of Paruk Hamlet) by Ahmad Tohari, the film follows the life of a young ronggeng in Banyumas, Central Java, and touches on the communist purge of 1965–1966. The film was selected as the Indonesian entry for the Best Foreign Language Oscar at the 85th Academy Awards, but it did not make the final shortlist.

Awards
Ifa's film Sang Penari garnered four Citra Awards at the 2011 Indonesian Film Festival, including Best Picture and Best Director.

Personal life
Ifa is married to fellow director Kamila Andini, daughter of director Garin Nugroho.

Filmography
, Ifa has been involved in 21 film productions (both theatrical and short) as director, producer, and/or screenwriter.

Harap Tenang, Ada Ujian! (2006), as director and screenwriter
Setengah Sendok Teh (2007), as director and screenwriter
Huan Chen Guang (2008), as producer, director, and screenwriter
9808 Antologi 10 Tahun Reformasi Indonesia (2008), as producer, director, and screenwriter
Garuda di Dadaku (2009), as director
Belkibolang (2010), as director
Sang Penari (2011), as director and screenwriter
Cewek Saweran (2011), as screenwriter
Rindu Purnama (2011), as screenwriter
Rumah dan Musim Hujan (2012), as producer, director, and screenwriter
Ambilkan Bulan (2012), as director
9 Summers 10 Autumns (2013), as director and screenwriter
Isyarat (2013), as producerMasked Monkey - The Evolution of Darwin's Theory (2014), as co-producerPendekar Tongkat Emas (2014), as director and screenwriterSiti (2014), as producer and executive producerPesantren Impian (2016), as directorCatatan Dodol Calon Dokter (2016), as directorTurah (2016), as producerThe Seen and Unseen (2017), co-producerHoax (2018), as producer, director, and screenwriterMemories of My Body (2018), as producerMountain Song (2019), as producerAbracadabra (2019), as producerYuni (2021), as producerBefore, Now & Then'' (2022), as producer

References
Footnotes

Bibliography

External links

1979 births
Living people
Indonesian film directors
Indonesian Muslims
People from Yogyakarta
Citra Award winners
Films directed by Ifa Isfansyah
Maya Award winners